Marius Obekop (born 19 December 1994) is a Cameroonian professional footballer who plays for Al-Diriyah as a midfielder.

Career

Early career
Obekop spent the majority of his youth career with Arsenal de Yaounde before joining Renaissance FC de Ngoumou in the Elite One, Cameroon's top division. He made his debut with Renaissance on 19 December 2010 in a match against Caiman Douala scoring on a shot from outside the box. Upon joining the club Obekop forced his way into the starting lineup and was a key player in helping Renaissance maintain its top flight status. In the 2012 season Obekop played 18 games for Renaissance in the league while also scoring five goals.

New York Red Bulls
In November 2012 scouts from Major League Soccer in the United States went to observe the top young Cameroonian players as selected by the Cameroonian Football Federation. Obekop impressed the American talent evaluators and earned a trial with New York Red Bulls in January 2013. On 18 March 2013 the Red Bulls announced that they had agreed to terms with Obekop. Obekop then made his professional debut with the team on 17 April 2013 against Sporting Kansas City.

New York Red Bulls II
Obekop was loaned to affiliate side New York Red Bulls II during the 2015 season and made his debut as a starter for the side in its first ever match on 28 March 2015 in a 0–0 draw with Rochester Rhinos. On 4 April 2015 Obekop scored his first goal for New York Red Bulls II, converting from the penalty spot to help the club to a 4–1 victory over Toronto FC II, the first victory in club history. On 27 June 2015 Obekop scored the  opening goal for the club in a 4–1 victory over Saint Louis FC. On  2 August 2015 Obekop scored the first goal of the match for New York in a 2–1 victory against Saint Louis FC. On 29 August 2015 Obekop scored his fifth goal of the season for NYRBII in a 2–0 victory over Wilmington Hammerheads FC.

Orlando City B
On 13 January 2016, Obekop signed with United Soccer League's Orlando City B. In his one season in Orlando Obekop appeared in 19 matches for the side.

International career
Obekop has represented Cameroon at the Under-17 and Under-20 levels. In 2010, he made his debut with the U-17s and scored 12 goals in 15 matches. The following year he appeared in 15 U-17 Cup of Nations qualifiers and scored 4 goals. In 2012, he appeared in 2 matches for the U-20s.

Career statistics

References

External links

WestAfricanFootball.com profile

1994 births
Living people
Cameroonian footballers
Cameroonian expatriate footballers
Renaissance FC de Ngoumou players
New York Red Bulls players
New York Red Bulls II players
Orlando City B players
FC Zimbru Chișinău players
Nantong Zhiyun F.C. players
China League One players
Masafi Club players
Al-Diriyah Club players
Major League Soccer players
USL Championship players
Moldovan Super Liga players
UAE First Division League players
Saudi First Division League players
Association football midfielders
Footballers from Yaoundé
Expatriate footballers in Moldova
Expatriate footballers in China
Expatriate soccer players in the United States
Expatriate footballers in the United Arab Emirates
Expatriate footballers in Saudi Arabia
Cameroon youth international footballers
Cameroon under-20 international footballers
Cameroonian expatriate sportspeople in China
Cameroonian expatriate sportspeople in the United States
Cameroonian expatriate sportspeople in the United Arab Emirates
Cameroonian expatriate sportspeople in Saudi Arabia